Cécile Debray, born November 20, 1966, is a French museum director, art historian and curator, specialist in modern and contemporary art in painting.

Cécile Debray is general heritage curator, director of the Musée de l'Orangerie since 2017. She has been awarded the medal of Officier des Arts et des Lettres by France in 2018.

Biography 
Museum director, Cécile de Debray studied art history before entering the Institut national du patrimoine in 1996.

Cécile Debray is the great-granddaughter of the academician writer Georges Duhamel and represents his heirs. She studied art history and history at Paris Nanterre University, at the École des Hautes Études en Sciences Sociales and at the University of Montreal, then, in 1996, joined the Institut national du patrimoine.

Professional career 
Director of the museums of Châteauroux, from 1997 to 2000, she was curator at the Museum of Modern Art of Paris from 2000 to 2005, scientific advisor to the General Administrator of the Réunion des Musées Nationaux and the Grand Palais des Champs -Élysées, in charge of the programming of the National Galleries of the Grand Palais, from 2005 to 2008.

From 2008 to 2017, Cécile Debray was chief curator in charge of modern collections at the National Museum of Modern Art-Centre Pompidou.

In 2009 she was co-curator with Camille Morineau of Elles@centrepompidou a female artists' exhibition, for which she was in charge of the travelling exhibition through the United States and Brazil with a selection of artworks focused on the American and Brazilian scenes.

A specialist in Henri Matisse, in 2012, she revealed the conceptual dimension of Matisse's work through the exhibition Matisse, Pairs and series highlighting the repetitive exploration of the same subject, of the same motif, which allowed the artist to explore painting.

In 2015, she designed the Marcel Duchamp monographic exhibition La peinture même. Cécile Debray shows the painting and the drawings which led the artist to the realization of the Grand Verre, La mariée mise à nu par ses célibataires, même, from 1910 to 1923. A new approach, the exhibition intends to show the paintings of the one who, according to the modernist doxa, wanted to kill painting.

In 2017, she succeeded Laurence des Cars as director of the Musée de l'Orangerie. She rethinks the presentation of the collections which has been accompanied by a renovation and redesign of spaces, and sets up "Contemporary Counterpoints", with artists such as Otobong Nkanga, Richard Jackson and Ann Veronica Janssens.

Cécile Debray is promoting in France in 2020 the work of the Portuguese artist Paula Rego, the only woman in the School of London, a figure of the movement against violence towards women and the ambivalence of childhood, which she exhibits at the museum of the Orangery. Invited by Jean de Loisy to the programme "L'art est la matière" (Art is matter) on France Culture, she says:The Orangery is a setting that allows a unique enhancement of the works. Thus, Paula Rego's pastels unfold in all their sensuality, between a very raw realism and a Hispanic baroque. In 2021, Cécile Debray is continuing her programme of historical exhibitions at the Musée de l'Orangerie with Soutine / de Kooning: La peinture incarnee (The Incarnate Painting), from September 14, 2021 to January 10, 2022, and David Hockney: The four seasons, from October 12, 2021 to February 10, 2022.

Exhibition curator (selection) 
As exhibition curator, Cécile Debray has designed and organized around twenty major exhibitions in unexplored territories, including Elles@centrepompidou in 2009 at the Center Pompidou, Dada Africa. Sources et influences extra-occidentales (Dada Africa. Extra-Western sources and influences) in 2017 at the Musée de l'Orangerie or Le modèle noir de Géricault à Matisse (The Black model from Géricault to Matisse in 2019 at the Musée d'Orsay.

 Le Nouveau Réalisme (New Realism), Grand Palais, March - July 2007
 elles@centrepompidou, Centre Pompidou, Paris, 2009/2011 ; Seattle, SAM, 2012/13 ; Rio, CCBB, 2013
 Lucian Freud : l'atelier, Centre Pompidou, Paris,  2010
 Matisse, Cézanne, Picasso… L’aventure des Stein, San Francisco, SFMoMA ; Paris, Grand Palais, 2011 ; New York, MET, 2012
 Matisse, paires et séries, Centre Pompidou, Paris, 2012 ; Copenhague SMK ; New York, MET 2013,
 Marcel Duchamp, La peinture, même, Centre Pompidou, september 2014-January 2015
 Balthus, une rétrospective, Scudiere dell Quirinal, Rome, Villa Medicis, Rome 2015 ; Vienne, Kunstforum, 2016
 Bacon / Nauman. Face à face, Musée Fabre, Montpellier 2017
 Derain,1904-1914, la décennie radicale, Centre Pompidou, Paris, October 2017-January 2018
 Dada Africa. Sources et influences extra-occidentales, Musée de l’Orangerie, October 2017- February 2018
 Nymphéas. Le dernier Monet et l'abstraction américaine, Musée de l'Orangerie 2018
 Franz Marc et August Macke, l'aventure du cavalier bleu, Musée de l'Orangerie 2019
 Le modèle noir de Géricault à Matisse, Musée d'Orsay, 2019
 Les contes cruels de Paula Rego, Musée de l'Orangerie, Paris, October 2018-January 2019
 Préhistoire, une énigme moderne, Centre Pompidou, Paris 2019

Publications (selection) 

 La Section d'or, Cécile Debray et Françoise Lucbert, Éditions Cercle d'art, Paris, 2000
 Gilles Aillaud, la jungle des villes, Cécile Debray et Martine Fresia, Didier Ottinger, Actes Sud, 2001
 Le Nouveau Réalisme, Cécile Debray, RMN, 2007
 Cézanne, Matisse, Picasso, l'aventure des Stein, Catalogue de l'exposition au Grand Palais, Cécile Debray (dir.), 2011-2012, Éditions RMN
 Matisse, Cécile Debray, éditions du Centre Pompidou, 2011
 Le Fauvisme, Cécile Debray, collection "Les grands mouvements et tendances", éditions Citadelles et Mazenod, 2014
 La fin des forêts, Cécile Debray, ¡ Viva Villa !, 2019
 Les vies minuscules, Cécile Debray, ¡ Viva Villa !, 2020
 Les Nymphéas de Claude Monet, Cécile Debray, éditions Hazan, 2020

Sources 

Directors of museums in France
French art historians
French art curators
Living people
1966 births
French women
French women curators
Women museum directors